After the breakup of Led Zeppelin in 1980 (following the death of drummer John Bonham), Robert Plant pursued a successful solo career comprising eleven studio albums, two compilation albums, three video albums, four collaborative albums, and 42 singles. He began his solo career with Pictures at Eleven in 1982, followed by 1983's The Principle of Moments. Popular tracks from this period include "Big Log" (a Top 20 hit in 1983), "In the Mood" (1984), "Little by Little" (from 1985's Shaken 'n' Stirred), "Tall Cool One" (a No. 25 hit off 1988's Now and Zen), Manic Nirvana "Hurting Kind (I've Got My Eyes on You)" (1990), and "I Believe" (from 1993's Fate of Nations), another song written for and dedicated to his late son, Karac. In 1984, Plant formed a short-lived all-star group with Jimmy Page and Jeff Beck called the Honeydrippers, who had a No. 3 hit with a remake of the Phil Phillips' tune, "Sea of Love" and a follow-up hit with a cover of Roy Brown's "Rockin' at Midnight". Although Plant avoided performing Led Zeppelin songs through much of this period, his tours in 1983 (with drummer Phil Collins) and 1985 were very successful, often performing to sold-out arena-sized venues.

In 2007, Plant collaborated with bluegrass and country music artist Alison Krauss. They released the critically accepted Raising Sand on 23 October 2007, via Krauss' record label, Rounder Records. The album proved to be a success, debuting at No. 2 on the all-genre Billboard 200 and No. 2 on the Top Country Albums chart. It was an international success as well, being certified Platinum in many countries. In 2008, the album's first single, "Gone, Gone, Gone (Done Moved On)", won the Grammy Award for Best Pop Collaboration with Vocals at the 50th Grammy Awards. At the 51st Grammy Awards, the album won all five categories in which it was nominated – Album of the Year, Best Contemporary Folk Album, Record of the Year (for "Please Read the Letter"), Best Pop Collaboration with Vocals (for "Rich Woman"), and the Grammy Award for Best Country Collaboration with Vocals (for "Killing the Blues").

Albums

Studio albums

Live albums

Collaborative albums

Studio

Live

Compilations

Albums

Box sets

Video albums

EPs
 More Roar (2015, live)

Singles

Solo singles and other charted songs

Collaboration singles with Jimmy Page

Collaboration singles with Alison Krauss

Other appearances

Music videos

Band work

Listen 

 "You'd Better Run"/"Everybody's Gonna Say" (1966), single

Led Zeppelin

The Honeydrippers 

 The Honeydrippers: Volume One (1984), EP

The Crawling King Snakes 

 "Philadelphia Baby" (1985), from the soundtrack album Porky's Revenge!

Saving Grace

References

External links
 Official discography of Robert Plant

Discography
Discographies of British artists
Rock music discographies